Scott Thompson (born February 25, 1965), known professionally as Carrot Top, is an American actor and stand-up comedian. He is widely known for his use of prop comedy.

Early life 
Thompson was born in Rockledge, Florida, and grew up in Cocoa. He is the youngest son of a NASA engineer. He went to Cocoa High School where he played drums in the marching and concert band. He graduated in 1983. He got the nickname "Carrot Top" from a local swimming coach, a reference to his red hair, which would become one of his trademarks in later life. In the late '80s, Thompson worked as a courier for a mortgage company. After high school he enrolled at Florida Atlantic University in Boca Raton. While a freshman there, Thompson appeared in his first standup comedy routine.

Career 
Carrot Top has appeared in Larry the Cable Guy's Christmas Spectacular, Gene Simmons Family Jewels, Space Ghost Coast to Coast, Criss Angel Mindfreak, Scrubs (2001), George Lopez, and Tugger: The Jeep 4x4 Who Wanted to Fly (2005). His film roles include Chairman of the Board, and he also served as a spokesman in commercials for 1-800-CALL-ATT. In 2002, he recorded a commentary track for The Rules of Attraction. In 2006, Carrot Top appeared in the Reno 911! episode "Weigel's Pregnant" as an enraged version of himself who trashes his hotel room and steals a police car. In 2008, he was a guest judge for Last Comic Standing.

From 1995 to 1999, Carrot Top was the continuity announcer for Cartoon Network, for which he also produced and starred in an early morning show called Carrot Top's AM Mayhem from 1994 to 1996.

Live comedy 
Since 2005, Carrot Top has headlined at MGM Resorts International properties in Las Vegas, Nevada.  He has a residency comedy show at the Luxor Hotel in Las Vegas since November 22, 2005, and performs various comedy engagements when his show is not playing. His comedy routine incorporates dozens of props stored in large trunks on stage; his prop jokes commonly consist simply of his pulling out a prop, describing it in a one-liner, and tossing it away.  He typically closes his show with a lip synced musical montage.

Television appearances
On January 16, 2010, Carrot Top appeared on Don't Forget the Lyrics!, wherein he assisted illusionists Penn & Teller in their quest for the million-dollar grand prize. He was one of the roasters at the Comedy Central Roast of Flavor Flav and Gene Simmons Roast. He appeared on a second-season episode of the TV series Mind Freak and continued to be a regular guest on the show. Carrot Top also appeared in an episode of the reality series The Bad Girls Club. He appeared as himself in "Man Up", an episode of CSI: Crime Scene Investigation, which was originally broadcast January 6, 2011, in Family Guy in 2006, in the episode "Petergeist", in Scrubs, in the episode "My Balancing Act", and in Robot Chicken, in the episode "The Unnamed One".

Carrot Top appeared briefly in both Bad Girls Club's third season, which originally aired in 2008 and 2009, and Holly's World, which ran from 2010 to 2011. He appeared alongside country artist Toby Keith in the music video for Keith's song "Red Solo Cup" and also appeared alongside Keith as he performed the song in the audience as a member of Keith's entourage at the 2011 ACM Awards.

Carrot Top has appeared on numerous nighttime television talk shows. In 1996, he appeared on the animated/live action Cartoon Network talk show Space Ghost Coast to Coast. On February 8, 2010, he appeared on an episode of The Jay Leno Show, wherein he had pies thrown at him by Leno and guest Emma Roberts. He also appeared on The Late Late Show with Craig Ferguson alongside Courteney Cox on May 24, 2011.

Carrot Top appeared on an episode of Tosh.0, receiving a full-body massage from Daniel Tosh. He was also a special guest performer in Tosh.0's Selena Gomez tribute video of "Good for You".

On October 22, 2011, Carrot Top appeared as a first-time guest panelist on Red Eye w/Greg Gutfeld. On April 13, 2016, he appeared as a panelist on the @midnight game show.

Internet series roles 
Carrot Top appeared as himself on the Bradley Cooper episode of Between Two Ferns with Zach Galifianakis. He also appeared as himself on the show Tom Green's House Tonight to discuss his props and career. In 2022, he appeared on "The Joe Rogan Experience" on Spotify episode #1758.

Filmography

References

External links 
 Official website
 

1965 births
Living people
20th-century American comedians
20th-century American male actors
21st-century American comedians
21st-century American male actors
American male comedians
American male film actors
American male television actors
American stand-up comedians
Florida Atlantic University alumni
Las Vegas shows
People from Cocoa, Florida
Prop comics
Television personalities from Florida